Communism in Vietnam is linked to the Politics of Vietnam and the push for independence. Marxism was introduced in Vietnam with the emergence of three communist parties: the Indochinese Communist Party, the Annamese Communist Party, and the Indochinese Communist Union, later joined by a Trotskyist movement led by Tạ Thu Thâu. In 1930, the Communist International (Comintern) sent Nguyễn Ái Quốc to Hong Kong to coordinate the unification of the parties into the Vietnamese Communist Party, with Trần Phú as its first Secretary General.

History

Later the party changed its name to the Indochinese Communist Party as the Comintern, under Joseph Stalin, did not favour nationalistic sentiments. Nguyễn Ái Quốc was a leftist revolutionary who had been living in France since 1911. Participating in the founding of the French Communist Party, in 1924 he traveled to the Soviet Union to join the Comintern and, in the late 1920s, acted as a Comintern agent to help build Communist movements in Southeast Asia.

During the 1930s, the Vietnamese Communist Party was nearly wiped out due to French execution of its top leaders such as Phú, Lê Hồng Phong, and Nguyễn Văn Cừ.

In 1941 Nguyễn Ái Quốc, now known as Hồ Chí Minh, arrived in northern Vietnam to form the Việt Minh Front, short for Việt Nam Độc Lập Đồng Minh Hội (League for the Independence of Vietnam). The Việt Minh Front was to be an umbrella group for parties fighting for Vietnam's independence from French and Japanese occupation, but was dominated by the Indochinese Communist Party. The Việt Minh had an armed force and, during the war, worked with the American Office of Strategic Services to collect intelligence on the Japanese. From China, other non-Communist Vietnamese parties also joined the Việt Minh and established armed forces with backing from the Kuomintang.

North Vietnam
Between 1953 and 1956, the North Vietnamese government instituted various agrarian reforms, including "rent reduction" and "land reform", which resulted in the execution of thousands of accused landlords. During the land reform, testimony from North Vietnamese witnesses suggested a ratio of one execution for every 160 village residents, which extrapolated to a nationwide total of almost 100,000 executions. Because the campaign was mainly concentrated in the Red River Delta area, a lower estimate of 50,000 executions was accepted by many scholars at the time. However, declassified documents from the Vietnamese and Hungarian archives indicate the number of executions was much lower than reported at the time, although likely greater than 13,500.

Vietnam War

North Vietnam established the National Liberation Front (NLF) on December 20, 1960, to foment insurgency in the South. Many of the Việt Cộng's core members were volunteer "regroupees", southern Việt Minh who had resettled in the North after the Geneva Accord (1954). Hanoi gave the regroupees military training and sent them back to the South along the Ho Chi Minh trail in the early 1960s. The NLF called for Southern Vietnamese to "overthrow the camouflaged colonial regime of the American Imperialists" and to make "efforts towards the peaceful unification". The PLAF's best-known action was the Tet Offensive, an assault on more than 100 South Vietnamese urban centres in 1968, including an attack on the U.S. embassy in Saigon. The offensive riveted the attention of the world's media for weeks, but also overextended the Việt Cộng. Later communist offensives were conducted predominantly by the North Vietnamese. The organisation was dissolved in 1976 when North and South Vietnam were officially unified under a communist government.

The Viet Cong are estimated to have killed about 36,725 South Vietnamese soldiers between 1957 and 1972. Statistics for 1968–72 suggest that "about 80 percent of the victims were ordinary civilians and only about 20 percent of them were government officials, policemen, members of the self-defence forces or pacification cadres." In the former capital city of Huế, Viet Cong troops captured the Imperial Citadel and much of the city, which led to the Battle of Huế. During the interim between the capture of the Citadel and the end of the "Battle of Huế", the occupying forces Massacre at Huế.

Post Vietnam War 
In 1975, Vietnam was officially reunified and renamed the Socialist Republic of Vietnam (SRVN), with its capital in Hà Nội. The Vietnamese Communist Party dropped its front name "Labor Party" and changed the title of First Secretary, a term used in China, to Secretary-General, used in the Soviet Union, with Lê Duẩn as its Secretary General. The National Liberation Front was dissolved. The Party emphasised the development of heavy industry and the collectivisation of agriculture. Over the next few years, private enterprises and private homes were seized by the government and their owners were often sent to the New Economic Zones to clear land, often to uninhabited forested areas. Members of the Vietnamese Communist Party, the North Vietnamese military or the former Viet Cong and their families were often the recipients of the confiscated properties, often in downtown areas of cities and towns. The farmers were coerced into state-controlled cooperatives. All food production was collectivised as it was in the North, forcing farmers and fishermen to sell their goods to the government at very low prices, otherwise farmers and fishermen couldn't purchase farming supplies and fishing equipment. Transportation of food and goods between provinces was deemed illegal except by the government. Within a short period of time, Vietnam was hit by severe shortages of food and basic necessities. 

In foreign relations, the SRVN became increasingly aligned with the Soviet Union by joining the Council for Mutual Economic Assistance (COMECON), and signing a Friendship Pact, which was in fact a military alliance, with the Soviet Union. Tensions between Vietnam and China mounted along with China's rivalry with the Soviet Union and conflict erupted with Cambodia, then China's ally. Vietnam was also subject to trade embargoes by the U.S. and its allies. Many of those who held high positions in the old South Vietnamese government and military, and others who profited from the colonial regime were sent to reeducation camps, which were actually hard labor prison camps. 

The SRVN government implemented a Stalinist dictatorship of the proletariat in the South as they did in the North. All religions had to be organised into state-controlled churches. Any negative comments about the Party, the government, Ho Chi Minh, or anything else that was critical of Communism might earn the person the tag of Phản Động (Reactionary), with consequences ranging from harassment by the police, to expulsion from one's school or workplace, or imprisonment. Nevertheless, the Communist authority failed to suppress the black market, where food, consumer goods, and banned literature could be bought at high prices. The security apparatus also failed to stop a clandestine nationwide network of people from trying to escape the country. In many cases, the security officers of whole districts were bribed and they even got involved in organising the escape schemes. 

These conditions resulted in an exodus of around 2.5 million Vietnamese (approximately 5% of the population) secretly escaping the country either by sea or overland through Cambodia. Some were successful in fleeing the region and large numbers of them landed in Malaysia, Indonesia, the Philippines, and Hong Kong, only to wind up in United Nations refugee camps. Some famous camps were Bidong in Malaysia, Galang in Indonesia, Bataan in the Philippines and Songkla in Thailand. Some managed to travel as far as Australia in crowded, open boats (see Boat People). 

While most refugees were resettled in other countries within five years, others languished in refugee camps for over a decade. In the 1990s, refugees who could not find asylum were deported back to Vietnam. Communities of Vietnamese refugees arrived in the US, Canada, Australia, France, West Germany, and the UK.

Vietnam's third Constitution, based on that of the USSR, was written in 1980. The Communist Party was stated by the Constitution to be the only party to represent the people and to lead the country, according to Communist ideals. 

In 1980, cosmonaut Phạm Tuân became the first Vietnamese person and the first Asian to go into space, traveling on the Soviet Soyuz 37 to service the Salyut 6 space station.

During the early 1980s, a number of overseas Vietnamese organisations were created with the aim of overthrowing the Vietnamese Communist government through armed struggle once peaceful protesting was no longer a viable option. Most groups attempted to infiltrate Vietnam but they were eventually executed by Vietnamese security and armed forces. Most notable were the organisations led by Hoàng Cơ Minh from the US, Võ Đại Tôn from Australia, and Lê Quốc Túy from France. Hoàng Cơ Minh was killed during an ambush in Laos. Võ Đại Tôn was captured and imprisoned until his release in December 1991. Lê Quốc Túy stayed in France so he could undergo kidney treatment while his allies were arrested and executed in Vietnam. These organisations gained massive funding from US-aligned interest groups as from their eyes, transitioning modern-day Vietnam into a democratic system would be a superior economic and social alternative and would improve the lifestyle of many of those living under the current socialist system (which utilises many capitalist-style marketing techniques anyway), whereas Pro-Socialists in Vietnam may unwittingly see this act, even if it is viewed as benign by pro-democratic, as an act of reopening unhealed wounds. Additionally, a drastic shift in governance ideology would produce a change too vast for the Vietnamese to cope with, as evident with how Russia suffered immense drops in economic and social conditions when USSR dissolved in 1991. In the following decades of the dissolution of the USSR, only five or six of the post-communist states are on a path to joining the wealthy capitalist West while most fell behind, some to such an extent that it will take over fifty years to catch up to where they were before the fall of the Soviet Bloc, justifying that Vietnam did not need to transition to democracy anytime soon.

However, throughout the 1980s, the voices of the Overseas Vietnamese and those struggling under the socialist system were not left unheard, as Vietnam made the transition from a centrally planned economy to a market economy. It had also received nearly $3 billion a year in economic and military aid from the Soviet Union. Most of its trade was conducted with the USSR and other COMECON (Council for Mutual Economic Assistance) countries during this time. Some cadres, realizing the economic suffering of the people, began to break the rules and experiment with market-oriented enterprises, thus, following models inspired by Western World values. This was tolerated by most local authorities before becoming widespread and popular after small business regulations loosened in the 1990s - around same the time the USSR started to dissolve. It was around this time in which Vietnam's economy started to recover and poverty levels gradually declined.

Government of Vietnam

The Socialist Republic of Vietnam is a one-party state. A new state constitution was approved in April 2013, replacing the 1980 version. The central role of the Communist Party was reasserted in all organs of government, politics and society. Only political organizations affiliated with or endorsed by the Communist Party are permitted to contest elections. These include the Vietnamese Fatherland Front, worker and trade unionist parties. The President of Vietnam is the titular head of state and the nominal commander-in-chief of the military of Vietnam, chairing the Council on National Defense and Security. The Prime Minister of Vietnam Phạm Minh Chính is the head of government, presiding over a council of ministers composed of three deputy prime ministers and the heads of 26 ministries and commissions.

The National Assembly of Vietnam is the unicameral legislature of the government, composed of 499 members. It is superior to both the executive and judicial branches, but not to the Communist Party. All members of the council of ministers (executive branch) are derived from the National Assembly. The Supreme People's Court of Vietnam, which is the highest court of appeal in the nation, is also answerable to the National Assembly. Beneath the Supreme People's Court stand the provincial municipal courts and the local courts. Military courts are also a powerful branch of the judiciary with special jurisdiction in matters of national security. All organs of Vietnam's government are controlled by the Communist Party. Most government appointees are members of the party. The General Secretary of the Communist Party is perhaps one of the most important political leaders in the nation, controlling the party's national organization and state appointments, as well as setting policy.

See also
Politics of Vietnam
Ho Chi Minh Thought
Trotskyism in Vietnam

References

 
History of Vietnam
Politics of Vietnam
Political history of Vietnam